Agabus paludosus is a species of beetles belonging to the family Dytiscidae.

Description
Head and pronotum are black, while elytrae are yellowish-brown.

Distribution
This species is present in most of Europe, in the East Palearctic ecozone and in Near East.

References

External links

 Agabus paludosus - Biodiversity Heritage Library - Bibliography
 Agabus paludosus - NCBI Taxonomy Database
 Agabus paludosus - Global Biodiversity Information Facility
 Agabus paludosus - Encyclopedia of Life

paludosus
Beetles described in 1801